Rosemont Theatre, Chicago, 9/01/04 is an Instant Live album by the Allman Brothers Band.  It was recorded at the Rosemont Theatre in Rosemont, Illinois, near Chicago, on September 1, 2004.

Track listing
Disc one
 "Mountain Jam" (17:39)
 "I Walk on Gilded Splinters" (6:12)
 "Dreams" (9:58)
 "Midnight Rider" (3:35)
 "Worried Down with the Blues" (8:39)
 "The Night They Drove Old Dixie Down" (5:36)
Disc two
 "Black Hearted Woman" (6:27)
 "Come On in My Kitchen" (6:43)
 "Why Does Love Got to Be So Sad?" (7:38)
 "Franklin's Tower" (8:59)
 "Instrumental Illness" (32:58)
Disc three
 "Stormy Monday" (9:59)
 "Good Morning Little Schoolgirl" (10:32)
 "Soulshine" (6:53)
 "Statesboro Blues" (7:54)
 "Mountain Jam" (8:19)

Personnel
Gregg Allman – organ, vocals
Warren Haynes – guitar, vocals
Derek Trucks – guitar
Oteil Burbridge – bass
Butch Trucks – drums
Jai Johanny "Jaimoe" Johanson – drums, congas

References

2004 live albums
The Allman Brothers Band live albums